This is a list of notable events in music that took place in the year 1922.

Specific locations
1922 in British music
1922 in Norwegian music

Specific genres
1922 in country music
1922 in jazz

Events
January 24 – Carl Nielsen conducts the first public performance of his Symphony No. 5 in Copenhagen.
May 28 – The Detroit News Orchestra, the world's first radio orchestra (a symphonic ensemble organized specifically to play on radio), begins broadcasting from radio station WWJ in Detroit, Michigan.
October 11 – Leila Megàne makes the first complete recording of Sir Edward Elgar's Sea Pictures, with Elgar himself conducting. 
October 19 – Maurice Ravel's orchestral arrangement of Modest Mussorgsky's Pictures at an Exhibition is premiered in Paris.
December 20 – Antigone by Jean Cocteau appears on the stage of the Théâtre de l'Atelier in Paris, with settings by Pablo Picasso, music by Arthur Honegger and costumes by Gabrielle Chanel.
Louis Armstrong leaves New Orleans for Chicago to join King Oliver's Creole Jazz Band.
Richard Tauber joins the Vienna State Opera.
Kid Ory makes his first recordings.
Earliest known example of American gospel song "This Train (is Bound for Glory)", a recording by Florida Normal and Industrial Institute Quartette, under the title "Dis Train".
The Central Band of the Royal Air Force becomes the first military band to make a radio broadcast with the British Broadcasting Company.
All musical compositions written in this year or earlier are now public domain in the United States.  Recordings of those compositions, however are still protected by various state statutes and do not fully enter the nationwide public domain until February 15, 2067.

Publications
Ferruccio Busoni – Von der Einheit der Musik, von Dritteltönen und junger Klassizität, von Bühnen und Bauten und anschliessenden Bezirken. Berlin: M. Hesse.

Published popular music
 "Aggravatin' Papa" w.m. Roy Turk, J. Russel Robinson & Addy Britt
 "Ain't It A Shame"  w.m. W. A. Hann, Joseph Simms & Al W. Brown
 "All Over Nothing At All"  w. J. Keirn Brennan & Paul Cunningham m. James Rule
 "Along The Road To Gundagai"  w.m. Jack O'Hagan
 "L'Amour, Toujours L'Amour (Love Everlasting)" w.(Eng) Catherine Chisholm Cushing m. Rudolf Friml
 "Angel Child" w. Georgie Price & Benny Davis m. Abner Silver
 "Baby Blue Eyes" w.m. Jesse Greer, Walter Hirsch & George Jessel
 "Bee's Knees" by Leo Wood & Ray Lopez
 "Blue (And Broken Hearted)"  w. Grant Clarke & Edgar Leslie m. Lou Handman
 "Broken Hearted Melody" w. Gus Kahn m. Isham Jones
 "A Brown Bird Singing" w. Rodney Richard Bennett m. Haydn Wood
 "Bugle Call Rag" m. Jack Pettis, Billy Meyers & Elmer Schoebel
 "Carolina in the Morning" w. Gus Kahn m. Walter Donaldson
 "Carolina Shout" m. James P. Johnson
 "Chicago" w.m. Fred Fisher
 "China Boy" w.m. Dick Winfree & Phil Boutelje
 "Crinoline Days" w.m. Irving Berlin
 "Dancing Fool" w. Harry B. Smith & Francis Wheeler m. Ted Snyder
 "Dearest (You're The Nearest To My Heart)" w. Benny Davis m. Harry Akst
 "Do It Again" w. B. G. De Sylva m. George Gershwin
 "Down In Midnight Town" w. Andrew B. Sterling & Edward P. Moran m. Harry Von Tilzer
 "Down Hearted Blues" w. Alberta Hunter m Lovie Austin
 "Dream On" (An Indian Lullaby) w. B.G DeSylva, m. Victor Herbert
 "Dreamy Melody" w.m. Ted Koehler, Frank Magine & C. Naset
 "Farewell Blues" w.m. Paul Joseph Mares, Leon Rappolo & Elmer Schoebel
 "Fate" by Byron Gay
 "Georgette"  w. Lew Brown m. Ray Henderson
 "Georgia" w. Howard Johnson m. Walter Donaldson
 "Goin' Home" w.m. Williams Arms Fisher
 "Hot Lips" w.m. Henry Busse, Henry Lange, Lou Davis
 "I Found A Four Leaf Clover" w. B. G. De Sylva m. George Gershwin
 "I Gave You Up Just Before You Threw Me Down" w. Bert Kalmar m. Harry Ruby & Fred E. Ahlert
 "I'll Build a Stairway to Paradise"  w. B. G. De Sylva & Ira Gershwin m. George Gershwin
 "I'm going Back to Yarrawonga" 
 "In The Little Red Schoolhouse" w.m. Al Wilson & James A. Brennan
 "A Kiss In The Dark" w. B. G. De Sylva m. Victor Herbert
 "Kitten on the Keys" m. Zez Confrey
 "The Lady In Ermine" w. Cyrus Wood m. Al Goodman
 "Lady Of The Evening" w.m. Irving Berlin.  Introduced by John Steel in the Music Box Revue of 1922.
 "Limehouse Blues" w. Douglas Furber m. Philip Braham
 "Lovesick Blues" w. Irving Mills m. Cliff Friend 
 "Lovin' Sam (The Sheik Of Alabam)" w. Jack Yellen m. Milton Ager
 "March With Me!" w. Douglas Furber m. Ivor Novello
 "Mary, Dear" w.m. Harry DeCosta & M. K. Jerome
 "Mister Gallagher and Mister Shean" w.m. Ed Gallagher & Al Shean
 "My Buddy" w. Gus Kahn m. Walter Donaldson
 "My Honey's Loving Arms" w. Herman Ruby m. Joseph Meyer
 "My Rambler Rose" w. Gene Buck m. Louis A. Hirsch & Dave Stamper
 "My Sweet Hortense" w. Joe Young & Sam Lewis m. Walter Donaldson
 "My Word You Do Look Queer" w.m. R. P. Weston & Bert Lee
 "'Neath The South Sea Moon" w. Gene Buck m. Louis A. Hirsch & Dave Stamper
 "Nellie Kelly I Love You" w.m. George M. Cohan
 "On the Alamo" w. Gus Kahn m. Isham Jones
 "On The Gin Gin Ginny Shore" w. Edgar Leslie m. Walter Donaldson
 "Oo-oo Ernest Are You Earnest With Me" w. Sidney Clare & Harry Tobias m. Cliff Friend
 "Pack Up Your Sins And Go To The Devil" w.m. Irving Berlin
 "Robinson Crusoe's Isle" w. Harry Graham m. Robert Stolz
 "Rosalie" w.m. Hugo Frey
 "Rose Of The Rio Grande" w. Edgar Leslie m. Harry Warren & Ross Gorman
 "Round On The End And High In The Middle (O-Hi-O)" w.m. Alfred Bryan & Bert Hanlon
 "Runnin' Wild" w. Joe Grey & Leo Wood m. A. Harrington Gibbs
 "Say It While Dancing" w. Benny Davis m. Abner Silver
 "Some Sunny Day" w.m. Irving Berlin
 "Stumbling" w.m. Zez Confrey
 "'Taint Nobody's Business If I Do" w.m. Clarence Williams, Porter Grainger & Graham Prince
 "That Da Da Strain" w. Mamie Medina m. Edgar Dowell
 "Three O'Clock in the Morning" w. Dorothy Terriss m. Julián Robledo 
 "Throw Me A Kiss" w. Gene Buck m. Louis A. Hirsch & Dave Stamper
 "Thru' The Night" w. Virginia K. Logan m. Frederic Knight Logan
 "Toot, Toot, Tootsie (Goo' Bye!)" w.m. Dan Russo, Ted Fio Rito, Gus Kahn & Ernie Erdman
 "Trees" w. Joyce Kilmer m. Oscar Rasbach
 "'Way Down Yonder In New Orleans" w. Henry Creamer m. Turner Layton
 "The West, A Nest, And You" w. Larry Yoell m. Billy Hill
 "When Hearts Are Young" w. Cyrus Wood m. Sigmund Romberg & Al Goodman
 "When The Leaves Come Tumbling Down" w.m. Richard Howard
 "When You And I Were Young, Maggie, Blues" w.m. Jack Frost & Jimmy McHugh
 "Who Cares?" w. Jack Yellen m. Milton Ager
 "Wonderful One" w. Dorothy Terris m. Paul Whiteman & Ferde Grofe
 "You Know You Belong To Somebody Else" w. Eugene West m. James V. Monaco
 "You Remind Me Of My Mother" w.m. George M. Cohan
 "You Tell Her, I S-t-u-t-t-e-r" w. Billy Rose m. Cliff Friend

Top Popular Recordings 1922

The following songs achieved the highest positions in Joel Whitburn's Pop Memories 1890-1954 and record sales reported on the "Discography of American Historical Recordings" website during 1922:
Numerical rankings are approximate, they are only used as a frame of reference.

Classical music
Kurt Atterberg – Cello Concerto
Alfredo Barbirolli – Sensuel-tango
Arnold Bax – First Symphony
Julián Carrillo – Preludio a Colón, for soprano in fifths of a tone, flute, violin, and guitar in quarter tones, octavina in eighth tones, and harp in sixteenth tones
Gerald Finzi – By Footpath and Stile, Op. 2
Vittorio Giannini – Stabat MaterHamilton Harty – Piano Concerto
Paul Hindemith – String Quartet No. 3 in C, Op. 22
Jacques IbertEscales, for orchestraHistoires, for piano
Manuel Infante – Sevillana "Impresiones de fiesta en Sevilla"Manuel Jovés (es)– Patotero sentimental
Ernesto Nazareth 
1922 (tango)
Desengonçado
Fóra dos eixos
Gaúcho
Jangadeiro
Mandinga
Meigo
O futurista
Por que sofre?...
Carl NielsenFynsk ForaarWind Quintet
Francis Poulenc – Sonata for horn, trumpet and trombone (subsequently revised)
Dmitri Shostakovich
Three Fantastic Dances, Op. 5, for piano
Suite in F-sharp minor, Op. 6, for two pianos
Vaughan Williams – Pastoral SymphonyWilliam Walton – Façade (subsequently revised)

Opera
Jean Cras – PolyphèmePaul Hindemith – Sancta SusannaLéo Manuel – Le fakir de BénarèsJules Massenet – AmadisOttorino Respighi – La bella dormente nel boscoIgor Stravinsky – MavraAlexander Zemlinsky – Der ZwergFilm
Hans Erdmann – Nosferatu: A Symphony of HorrorJazz

Musical theater
 The Cabaret Girl (Music: Jerome Kern, Book and Lyrics: P. G. Wodehouse and George Grossmith, Jr.) London production opened at the Winter Garden Theatre on September 19 and ran for 361 performances
 The Hotel Mouse Broadway production opened at the Shubert Theatre on March 13 and ran for 88 performances
 Little Nellie Kelly Broadway production opened at the Liberty Theatre on November 13 and ran for 276 performances
 Make It Snappy Broadway revue opened at the Winter Garden Theatre on April 13 and ran for 96 performances.  Starring Eddie Cantor, Lew Hearn, J. Harold Murray, Nan Halperin, Georgie Hale and Tot Qualters.
 The Music Box Revue of 1922 opened at the Music Box Theatre on October 23 and ran for 330 performances
 Orange Blossoms (music Victor Herbert) opened at the Fulton Theatre on September 19 and ran for 95 performances
 Phi-Phi London production opened at the Pavilion Theatre on August 16 and ran for 132 performances
 Queen O' Hearts Broadway production opened at the Cohan Theatre on October 10 and ran for 40 performances
 Whirled into Happiness London production opened at the Lyric Theatre on May 18 and ran for 246 performances

Births
January 4 – Frank Wess, American saxophonist and flute player (d. 2013)
January 7 – Jean-Pierre Rampal, flautist (d. 2000)
January 16 – Ernesto Bonino, Italian singer (d. 2008)
January 28 – Anna Gordy Gaye, American songwriter and producer, co-founder of Anna Records (d. 2014)
February 1 – Renata Tebaldi, operatic soprano (d. 2004)
February 16 – Geraint Evans, operatic baritone (d. 1992)
February 17 – Tommy Edwards, singer (d. 1969)
February 19 – Fredell Lack, American violinist (d. 2017)
March 28 – Felice Chiusano, Italian singer (Quartetto Cetra) (d. 1990)
April 3 – Doris Day, actress and singer (d. 2019)
April 4 – Elmer Bernstein, film composer (d. 2004)
April 5 – Gale Storm, singer and actress (d. 2009)
April 7 – Mongo Santamaría, percussionist (d. 2003)
April 14 – Ali Akbar Khan, Indian sarod player (d. 2009)
April 18 – Lord Kitchener, calypsonian (d. 2000)
April 22 – Charles Mingus, jazz musician (d. 1979)
April 29 – Toots Thielemans, Belgian musician (d. 2016)
May 18 – Kai Winding, Danish-born jazz musician (d. 1983)
May 25 – Kitty Kallen, American singer (d. 2016)
May 29 – Iannis Xenakis, composer (d. 2001)
June 1 – Bibi Ferreira, Brazilian singer and actress (d. 2019)
June 10 – Judy Garland, American singer and actress (d. 1969)
June 12 – Leif Thybo, Danish composer and organist (d. 2001)
June 17 – Jerry Fielding, American radio, film and television composer, arranger, conductor and musical director (d. 1980)
June 23 – Francis Thorne, American composer (d. 2017)
June 24 – Tata Giacobetti, Italian singer and lyricist (Quartetto Cetra) (d. 1988)
June 27 – George Walker, African American classical composer (d. 2018)
August 11 – Ron Grainer, television composer (d. 1981)
August 13 – T. K. Murthy, Indian mridangam player 
August 31 – John Hanson, singer and actor (d. 1998)
September 3 – Salli Terri, singer and songwriter (d. 1996)
September 13 – Yma Sumac, Peruvian singer (d. 2008)
September 16 – Janis Paige, American singer and actress
September 18 – Ray Steadman-Allen, English composer for Salvation Army bands (d. 2014)
September 20 – William Kapell, American pianist (d. 1953)
October 4 – Dudley Simpson, Australian composer and conductor (d. 2017)
October 17 – Luiz Bonfá, guitarist and composer (d. 2001)
November 15 – Doreen Carwithen, composer (d. 2003)
December 26 – Harry Choates, American Cajun fiddler (d. 1951)

Deaths
January 26 – Luigi Denza, composer (b. 1846)
March 4 – Bert Williams, star of the Ziegfeld Follies (b. 1875)
March 10 – Hans Sitt, violinist and composer (b. 1850)
March 15 – Ika Peyron, pianist and composer (b. 1845)
March 22 – Nikolay Sokolov, composer (b. 1859)
April 12 – František Ondříček, violinist and composer (b. 1857)
April 18 – Percy Hilder Miles, violinist, composer and teacher (b. 1878)
April 21 – Alessandro Moreschi, the last known castrato singer of the Vatican.(b. 1858)
April 29 – Kyrylo Stetsenko, conductor and composer (b. 1882) (typhus)
May 2 – Ada Jones, US singer (b. 1873)
May 7 – Max Wagenknecht, composer for organ and piano (b. 1857)
May 15 – Harry Williams songwriter and music publisher (b. 1879)
May 18 – Eugenia Burzio, Italian operatic soprano (b. 1872)
May 22 – Carl Teike, composer (b. 1864)
May 31 – Rutland Barrington, baritone of the D'Oyly Carte Opera Company (b. 1873)
June 5 – Lillian Russell, US singer and actress (b. 1860)
June 20 – Vittorio Monti, composer (b. 1868)
July 24 – George Thorne, baritone of the D'Oyly Carte Opera Company (b. 1856)
August 5 – William Seidel, Band instrument manufacturer (died 1922 – suicide)
August 13 – Tom Turpin, ragtime composer (b. 1871)
August 18 – Dame Genevieve Ward, soprano (b. 1837)
August 19 – Felipe Pedrell, composer (b. 1841)
August 22 – Sofia Scalchi, operatic contralto (b. 1850)
October 7 – Marie Lloyd, British music-hall singer (b. 1870)
October 27 – Rita Fornia, US operatic soprano (b. 1878)
November 6 – William Baines, English composer and pianist (b. 1899)
November 14 – Karl Michael Ziehrer, composer and bandmaster (b. 1843)
December 30 – Richard Zeckwer, composer and music teacher (b. 1850)date unknown – George H. Diamond, entertainer and songwriter (b. 1862)date unknown'' – Alfred Lamy, maker of violin bows (b. 1886)

References 

 
20th century in music
Music by year